Pian Camuno (locally ) is a comune in the province of Brescia, in Lombardy. It is situated in the lower part of Val Camonica.

References

Cities and towns in Lombardy